Horst Carganico (27 September 1917 – 27 May 1944) was a German Luftwaffe military aviator and fighter ace during World War II. He is credited with 60 aerial victories achieved in over 600 combat missions. This figure includes 54 aerial victories on the Eastern Front, and further six victories over the Western Allies.

Born in Breslau, Carganico grew up in the Weimar Republic and Nazi Germany. He joined the military service in the Luftwaffe in 1937. Following flight training, he was posted to Jagdgeschwader 1 (JG 1—1st Fighter Wing). In April 1940, he became Adjutant of II. Gruppe (2nd group) of Jagdgeschwader 77 (JG 77—77th Fighter Wing), serving in Norway. He claimed his initial victory on 21 June 1940. Following his 27th aerial victory, he was awarded the Knight's Cross of the Iron Cross on 25 September 1941. Carganico commanded the II. Gruppe of Jagdgeschwader 5 (JG 5—5th Fighter Wing) and later I. Gruppe of JG 5 fighting in Defense of the Reich. On 27 May 1944, he was killed in action when his aircraft hit high tension cables while attempting a forced landing.

Career
Carganico, the son of a Luftwaffe officer, was born on 27 September 1917 in Breslau in the Kingdom of Prussia of the German Empire, present-day Wrocław in western Poland. He joined the Luftwaffe in 1937 and attended  pilot school at Berlin-Johannisthal. At the outbreak of World War II Carganico was Technical Officer with the staff of Jagdgeschwader 1 (JG 1—1st Fighter Wing). In April 1940, he served with II. Gruppe (2nd group) of Jagdgeschwader 77 (JG 77—77th Fighter Wing). During Operation Weserübung (9 April – 10 June 1940), the German assault on Denmark and Norway, Carganico served as adjutant to Hauptmann Karl Hentschel, the commanding officer of II. Gruppe. 

Scharnhorst was taken to Trondheim for temporary repairs. Preliminary repairs were completed by 20 June, which permitted the ship to return to Germany. The following day, the Royal Air Force (RAF) launched an aerial attack on Scharnhorst. In defense of attacks against Scharnhorst, II. Gruppe flew multiple escort missions from Stavanger-Sola. Between 16:00 and 18:00, the Gruppe engaged RAF bombers and torpedo bombers over the German ships. In this encounter, Carganico claimed the destruction of a Bristol Beaufort torpedo bomber, his first aerial victory. On 9 July, RAF bombers attacked Stavanger-Sola. The bombers were intercepted by fighters from II. Gruppe and Carganico shot down two Bristol Blenheim bombers. 

Carganico was promoted to Oberleutnant (first lieutenant) on 1 September. He claimed his fourth aerial victory on 14 October over a Lockheed Hudson aircraft. On 9 November, II. Gruppe of JG 77 left Norway and headed to Aalborg Airfield and then to the airfield Brest-Süd, present-day BAN Lanvéoc-Poulmic, at the Roadstead of Brest in northwestern France by 23 November. Patrolling the French coast, Carganico claimed his fifth victory on 30 November over a Blenheim bomber.

Squadron leader
On 1 February 1941, a new I. Gruppe of JG 77 was created under the command of Hauptmann Walter Grommes. This unit was based at Stavanger-Sola and was tasked with providing fighter escort for German shipping on the southern and western Norwegian coast. Command of 1. Staffel (1st squadron) of JG 77 was given to Oberleutnant Carganico who had been transferred. As a commander, authors Bergström and Mikhailov characterize Carganico as a hard-core Nazi, unsympathetic and ambitious. On 24 May, Carganico claimed his sixth aerial victory when he shot down Blenheim bomber L9267 from No. 114 Squadron. On 4 June 1941, 1. Staffel was detached from the Gruppe and relocated to Kirkenes Airfield in preparation of Operation Barbarossa, the German invasion of the Soviet Union. In northern Norway, 1. Staffel became part of IV. Gruppe of JG 77 which in September was referred to as Jagdgruppe z.b.V. Petsamo (zur besonderen Verwendung—for special deployment) and headed by Major Henning Strümpell.

German forces launched Operation Barbarossa on 22 June 1941. On 25 June, the Staffel moved to Petsamo-Luostari as part of Operation Silver Fox. During the following weeks, Carganico claimed further aerial victories, not all of which can be exactly dated. On 29 June, a flight from 1. Staffel intercepted eight Beriev MBR-2 flying boats from 118 RAP (Radzvedyvatel'nyy Aviatsionnyy Polk—Reconnaissance Aviation Regiment). They were returning from a bombing mission to Liinakhamari. Three MBR-2 flying boats were shot down, two by Carganico. The 2. Gebirgs Division (2nd Mountain Division) attempted to cross the Zapadnaya Litsa on 13 July. In support of this attack, JG 77 flew a number of combat air patrols. Attacking the Soviet airfield at Shonguy, Carganico claimed the destruction of a Polikarpov I-16 fighter. Following his 27th aerial victory claimed, he was awarded the Knight's Cross of the Iron Cross on 25 September 1941. The presentation was made by Generaloberst Hans-Jürgen Stumpff, the commander of Luftflotte 5 (5th Air Fleet), at Petsamo.

In January 1942, Jagdgeschwader 5 (JG 5—5th Fighter Wing) was newly created and placed under the command of Oberst Carl-Alfred Schumacher. On 3 January, I. Gruppe of JG 77 was renamed and became the I. Gruppe of JG 5. In consequence, Carganico's 1. Staffel became the newly created 1. Staffel of JG 5. On 21 March, 1. Staffel was subordinated to II. Gruppe of JG 5, commanded by Strümpell, and became the 6. Staffel of JG 5. On 26 April, seven Petlyakov Pe-2 bombers, escorted by fighters from the 95 IAP (Istrebitelny Aviatsionny Polk—Fighter Aviation Regiment), attacked the Kirkenes Airfield. The attack force failed to inflict any damage to the airfield as five of the attackers were shot down, including two by Carganico and two by Unteroffizier Rudolf Müller. Two days later, 6. Staffel encountered Hurricane fighters from 2 GvSAP (Gvardeyskiy Smeshannyy Aviatsionnyy Polk—Guards Composite Aviation Regiment) over the Motovsky Gulf. 2 GvSAP lost three fighters in this engagement plus two further Hurricanes were severely damaged. German pilots claimed nine aerial victories, including two by Carganico.

Group commander

Carganico was appointed Gruppenkommandeur (group commander) of II. Gruppe of JG 5 on 1 June 1942, succeeding Strümpell who had been transferred. Command of 6. Staffel was passed to Oberleutnant Dieter Hartwein. On 26 July, Stumpff wrote to the Luftwaffenpersonalamt, the personnel department within the Ministry of Aviation (RLM—Reichsluftfahrtministerium), requesting a preferential promotion for Carganico to Hauptmann (captain). Stumpff also requested that Carganico's command of II. Gruppe be made permanently. Apparently, Carganico appointment to Gruppencommandeur had been temporary.

In summer 1942, he claimed 23 victories in six weeks and was awarded the German Cross in Gold on 18 May. This aircraft is currently on display at the Canada Aviation and Space Museum. He evaded capture, headed west and reached a German infantry position the next day where he was picked up by a Fieseler Fi 156 Storch and flown back to Petsamo.

Defense of the Reich
On 16 March 1944, the commander of I. Gruppe of JG 5, Major Erich Gerlitz, was killed in action. At the time, I. Gruppe was based in Herzogenaurach Airfield and was fighting the United States Army Air Forces (USAAF) in Defense of the Reich. Carganico succeeded Gerlitz as commander of I. Gruppe and at the same time was promoted to Major (major). Carganico's successor as commander of II. Gruppe of JG 5 was Hauptmann Theodor Weissenberger, initially as acting commander until he was officially appointed on 16 April. On 10 May, Carganico shot down the RAF de Havilland Mosquito PR.IX LR421 from the aerial reconnaissance  No. 540 Squadron.

On 27 May, five Luftwaffe Gruppen joined up around Karlsruhe to defend against an attack on southern Germany. The fighters were then vectored to a point of intercept southwest of Strasbourg were they were to engage USAAF bombers. On the approach, the German fighters were intercepted by USAAF fighters. Carganico lost his adjutant and wingman, Hauptmann Heinz Deuschle, early in the encounter, shot down by North American P-51 Mustang fighters. Carganico was the son of Luftwaffe general Generalleutnant Victor Carganico. He was buried in the military section of the Waldfriedhof Zehlendorf on 6 June 1944. Command of I. Gruppe was given to Weissenberger, who took control of the Gruppe in early June 1944.

Summary of career

Aerial victory claims
According to US historian David T. Zabecki, Carganico was credited with 60 aerial victories. Obermaier also lists Carganico with 60 aerial victories claimed in over 600 combat missions, including six victories over the Western Allies. Mathews and Foreman, authors of Luftwaffe Aces — Biographies and Victory Claims, researched the German Federal Archives and states that Carganico was credited with approximately 60 aerial victories. This figure includes 54 aerial victories on the Eastern Front and six over the Western Allies.

Victory claims were logged to a map-reference (PQ = Planquadrat), for example "PQ 25 Ost 96216". These sectors were then subdivided into 36 smaller units to give a location area 3 × 4 km in size.

Awards
 Knight's Cross of the Iron Cross on 25 September 1941 as Oberleutnant and Staffelkapitän of the 6./Jagdgeschwader 5
 German Cross in Gold on 18 May 1942 as Oberleutnant in the 6./Jagdgeschwader 5

Notes

References

Citations

Bibliography

External links
TracesOfWar.com
Lexikon der Wehrmacht
Aces of the Luftwaffe 
Ciel de Gloire

1917 births
1944 deaths
Luftwaffe pilots
German World War II flying aces
Recipients of the Gold German Cross
Recipients of the Knight's Cross of the Iron Cross
Luftwaffe personnel killed in World War II
Military personnel from Wrocław
People from the Province of Silesia
Burials at the Waldfriedhof Zehlendorf
Aviators killed in aviation accidents or incidents in France